Crassaluna is an extinct genus of cystoporate bryozoan of the family Anolotichiidae, known from the Ordovician period. It had an  encrusting growth habit or, in the case of C. fungiforme, formed cup-shaped colonies. Its colonies possessed a vesicular skeleton and monticules. Its cyst-like interzooecial spaces are a distinguishing feature.

Species

References

Prehistoric bryozoan genera
Cystoporida